Hanus may refer to:

Places
 Hanus, Poland, a settlement in the administrative district of Gmina Płaska, within Augustów County, Podlaskie Voivodeship.

People

Given name
Hanuš Burger (1909-90), Czech film and theatre director
Hanus Kamban (born 1942), Faroese writer
Hanus G. Johansen (born 1950), Faroese singer-songwriter
Hanus Thorleifsson (born 1985), Faroese footballer

Family name
Danielle Hanus (born 1988), Canadian swimmer
Emmerich Hanus (1884-1956), Austrian actor
František Hanus (actor) (1916-91), Czech actor
František Hanus (footballer) (born 1982), Czech footballer
Kevin Hanus (born 1993), German motorcyclist
Heinz Hanus (1882-1972), Austrian film director
Jerome Hanus (born 1940), American Catholic prelate

See also
 Hanuš (disambiguation)